Sunayna Kuruvilla (born 22 May 1999 in Kochi) is an Indian professional squash player. As of February 2018, she was ranked number 89 in the world. She has played in the main draw of numerous professional tournaments. She has won silver medal in women's team event in Asian games 2018.

References

1999 births
Living people
Sportspeople from Kochi
Racket sportspeople from Kerala
Indian female squash players
Asian Games medalists in squash
Asian Games silver medalists for India
Squash players at the 2018 Asian Games
Medalists at the 2018 Asian Games
South Asian Games gold medalists for India
South Asian Games silver medalists for India
South Asian Games medalists in squash
Squash players at the 2022 Commonwealth Games
Commonwealth Games competitors for India